Rostelecom is Russia’s largest provider of digital services for a wide variety of consumers, households, private businesses, government and municipal authorities, and other telecom providers.
Rostelecom interconnects all local public operators’ networks into a single national network for long-distance service.  In other words, if one makes a long-distance call or originates Internet contact to or from Russia, it is likely that Rostelecom is providing part of the service. The company's stock trades primarily on the Moscow Exchange.

History
Prior to 1990, responsibility for the provision of telecommunications services lie at the Ministry of Communications of the USSR. On June 26, 1990, the Ministry of Communications of the USSR established a state-owned joint-stock company Sovtelekom, which was given the rights to operate the telecommunications network of the USSR. On December 30, 1992, by order of the State Property Committee of Russia, a state-owned enterprise Rostelecom, which consisted of 20 state long-distance and international calls, as well as communication equipment Intertelekom was organized.

Throughout the 1990s, the company which was part of Svyazinvest, was the sole long-distance operator in Russia. Alongside it, local companies operated in the different regions of Russia under the umbrella of Svyazinvest while Rostelecom connected between their networks. In 2001, these companies were merged to form a number of regional incumbent telecommunications operators: CentreTelecom, SibirTelecom, Dalsvyaz, Uralsvyazinform, VolgaTelecom, North-West Telecom, Southern Telecommunications Company and Dagsvyazinform. On 2011, Svyazinvest was liquidated with the regional subsidiaries merged into Rostelecom.

On October 18, 2006 "Rostelecom" received a certificate of quality of IP-MPLS network and became the ISP backbone. In December 2006, Rostelecom and the telecommunications company KDDI in Japan under the "Transit Europe - Asia" signed an agreement to build a line of Nakhodka - Naoetsu with total bandwidth of 640 Gbit/s instead of the previous 560 Mbit/s.

Ownership
Owners of Rostelecom ordinary (voting) share as of November 2021:
 Federal Agency for State Property Management (38.2%)
 JSC Telecom Investments (20.98%)
 VTB Bank (8.44%)
 Vnesheconombank (3.96%)

Operations
PJSC Rostelecom is the largest integrated digital services and products provider, operating in all segments of the telecommunications market in Russia. The Company serves millions of households, state and private enterprises across the country.

Rostelecom is a key strategic innovator that provides solutions in the following fields: E-Government, cybersecurity, data-centres and cloud computing, biometry, healthcare, education and housing & utility services.

Land network
The company's network is based on extant Russian fiber-optic cable lines - FOCL.  By cable the network is connected to countries in Europe and East Asia.

Fiber-optic cable lines crosses Russian Federation on directions «Moscow — Novorossiysk», «Moscow — Khabarovsk» and «Moscow — Saint Petersburg».

IP transit has been allocated to a separate company, RTComm, using Rostelecom's STM-16 FOCL resources, but Rostelecom is building its own STM-64 (9,9533 Gbit/s) network, which as of August 2006, covered Rostov-on-Don, Krasnodar, Volgograd, Stavropol, and planned to cover the whole of Russia by the end of 2006.

Rostelecom had 29.2 million local fixed-line voice subscribers, 12.4 million mobile voice subscribers, 7.4 million fixed-line broadband subscribers and 5.5 million pay-TV subscribers at the end of the first quarter of 2010.

Satellite network
Using the services of the Russian Orbital Group, Rostelecom has built its satellite system for its Eastern region, comprising 11 land stations in Siberia and the Russian Far East.  Satellite service for the Western region is being built at this time.

Cellular network
Throughout the 90s Rostelecom created subsidiaries that operated cellular networks in different regions of the country, including NSS, Baikalvestkom, Yeniseikom, SkyLink, Volgograd GSM and Akos which provided mobile services on the territory of 59 regions of Russia, serving more than 13.5 million subscribers. During the 2010s, Rostelecom and its subsidiaries built mobile networks of the third generation in 27 regions of Russia. Total planned to install more than 8 thousand base stations. Suppliers of equipment and solutions for the 3G+ network are Ericsson and Huawei. In April 2013 the company announced the launch of 3G+ networks in the Sverdlovsk, Kurgan and Chelyabinsk regions, in the south of the Tyumen Oblast and in the Yamalo-Nenets Autonomous Area. This launch followed the introduction of 3G+ services in Perm Krai. Rostelecom's 3G+ network was installed using HSPA+ technology, providing data transfer speeds of up to 21MB/s, with the possibility of upgrading the network to reach speeds of up to 42MB/s if demand requires. The 3G+ network is LTE-ready, so that only minor modifications will be required before the company can roll out its 4G (LTE) network in the future. In June 2013 Rostelecom launched its first part of its LTE network in Sochi for the 2014 Winter Olympics. Besides, the company launched LTE networks in 8 other regions besides Karsnodar Krai by the end of 2013, including Khanty-Mansi Autonomous Okrug, Republic of Khakassia, Republic of North Ossetia–Alania, Sakhalin Oblast, Chukotka Autonomous Okrug, Nenets Autonomous Okrug and the Jewish Autonomous Oblast.

In December 2013, Rostelecom board approved a plan to merge its mobile business into Tele2 Russia, former division of Nordic telecoms group Tele2 which sold it in April 2013 to VTB Bank due to the lack of 3G and 4G data licences, limiting its future growth prospects. Rostelecom would get a 45% voting stake in the new company, T2 RTK Holding, in exchange for contributing its standalone mobile subsidiaries and assets, including SkyLink. Tele2 Russia, owned by state-controlled bank VTB and Russian businessmen Yuri Kovalchuk and Alexei Mordashov, will have 55%. Rostelecom and Tele2 Russia together have around 38 million mobile subscribers, or a combined market share of 16%. During the second stage, Rostelecom spun-off its integrated mobile businesses into its new wholly owned subsidiary, RT-Mobile, which will be expected to have Rostelecom's mobile licences, including the LTE licences, re-issued to it. Analysts said the deal makes sense as "Rostelecom has been less efficient in rolling out mobile networks. By relying on the Tele2 team in mobile expansion Rostelecom removes risks, while remaining open to an upside". In February 2014 Rostelecom and Tele2 signed a framework agreement on the integration of mobile assets to the authorized capital of the joint venture "T2 Rus Holding". At the first stage of integration, Rostelecom passed seven cellular subsidiaries it owns: "Sky Link", "Nizhny Novgorod Cellular Communications", "Baikalwestcom", " Volgograd GSM" Yenisei Telecom" and ICCO.

Controversy
In April 2017, Rostelecom (AS12389) originated 50 prefixes for numerous other autonomous systems (AS). This caused Internet traffic normally destined for these organizations to instead be routed to Rostelecom. The hijacked prefixes belonged to financial institutions (most notably MasterCard and Visa), other telecom companies, and a variety of other organizations. What makes the list of affected networks 'curious' is the high number of financial institutions such as: MasterCard, Visa, Fortis, Alfa-Bank, and more. The other notable characteristic of this event is that the advertisement included several more prefixes that were more specifically defined than the prefixes normally announced, which makes it less likely that these were unintentionally leaked.

In 2017 State-owned Rostelecom PJSC has been selected to run the database, which will collect personal data including images of faces, voice samples and, eventually, irises and fingerprints.

References

External link

 
Telecommunications companies of Russia
Internet service providers of Russia
Mobile phone companies of Russia
Digital television
Streaming television
Government-owned companies of Russia
Companies based in Moscow
Telecommunications companies established in 1993
1993 establishments in Russia
Companies listed on the Moscow Exchange
Russian brands
Russian entities subject to the U.S. Department of the Treasury sanctions